Vasco de Ataíde (or Taide) was a Portuguese sailor whose ship was a part of Pedro Álvares Cabral 1500 expedition to India. His ship went missing early in the voyage and so was not present when the fleet accidentally became the first recorded European presence in Brazil. little is known about him, even less than about his brother Pêro de Ataíde. On Tuesday, 24 March 1500 the ship he captained and its one-hundred-and-fifty crew disappeared after sailing west toward Brazil. The ship had departed the day before from the Portuguese settlement at Cape Verde, off the coast of Western Africa.

Pêro Vaz de Caminha, chronicler of Cabral's expedition wrote "On the night of Monday next, at sunrise, Vasco de Ataíde was lost from the fleet without any strong or contrary winds that could make it happen. The captain did his best to find it, but it appeared no more."

See also
List of people who disappeared mysteriously at sea

References

1500 deaths
1500s missing person cases
15th-century births
15th-century Portuguese people
Lost explorers
Maritime history of Portugal
Missing person cases in Africa
People lost at sea
Portuguese explorers of South America
Portuguese sailors